These are things named after Carl Gustav Jacob Jacobi (1804–1851), a German mathematician.

Jacobi

Jacobian 

Jacobi